The Triple Crown refers to winning the three most prestigious tournaments in the Professional Darts Corporation: the World Championship, Premier League Darts, and the World Matchplay. Players who win all three tournaments over the course of their career are said to have won the PDC Triple Crown.

Three professional players have won a career PDC Triple Crown: Phil Taylor, Michael van Gerwen, and Gary Anderson. Taylor has won the most Triple Crown titles, with 36, while van Gerwen has won 12 and Anderson 5. Only Taylor has won all three Triple Crown events in a single season, accomplishing this feat twice (in 2006 and 2010).

History
In 1994, the World Championship was held for the first time, with Dennis Priestley winning the first PDC Triple Crown event, the only such win of his career. Larry Butler became the first winner of the World Matchplay that same year, and this also the only Triple Crown event he won.
In 2005, the first Premier League was held, with 7 players taking part. The event was won by Phil Taylor, who became the first player to win a career PDC Triple Crown in the process.

Career Triple Crown winners
Three players have completed a career Triple Crown: Phil Taylor, Michael van Gerwen, and Gary Anderson. Only Taylor has won all three Triple Crown events in the same year. He has done so twice, in 2006 and 2010.

One win away from Triple Crown
James Wade has won the Premier League and World Matchplay once each, meaning he needs to win the World Championship to complete the Triple Crown. Peter Wright is yet to win the Premier League, but does have two World Championship titles and a Matchplay title to his name. With three Triple Crown competition wins, he has the highest number of Triple Crown titles of any player who has not completed the set.  Rob Cross also needs to win the Premier League to complete the Triple Crown having won the World Championship in 2018 and World Matchplay in 2019.
Raymond van Barneveld has won the Premier League and World Championship once each, and needs to win a Matchplay to complete the set.

Other tournament winners
As of 2023, five players have won the World Championship and neither of the other two Triple Crown events: Adrian Lewis (2011 and 2012), John Part (2003 and 2008), Dennis Priestley (1994), Gerwyn Price (2021) and Michael Smith (2023). Rod Harrington has won two Triple Crown titles, both at the World Matchplay (1998 and 1999).
Larry Butler (1994), Peter Evison (1996), Colin Lloyd (2005) and Dimitri Van den Bergh (2020) have each won one Triple Crown title, the World Matchplay. Glen Durrant (2020) and Johnny Clayton (2021) won their only Triple Crown title, to date, in the Premier League.

References

Professional Darts Corporation tournaments
World Matchplay (darts)
Premier League Darts
Darts tournaments